Victorine was a schooner of 70 tons built in Mauritius and registered in Hobart. Owned by Edward Lord, she disappeared off the coast of Australia in 1822.

On 24 August 1822, the schooner, under command of Captain William Risk, left Sydney bound for Mauritius.  Carrying a crew of seven or eight the ship disappeared en route and was presumed lost.

References

1788–1850 ships of Australia
Schooners of Australia
Individual sailing vessels
Missing ships
Ships lost with all hands
Maritime incidents in 1822
1822 in Australia
Merchant ships of Australia
Missing_ships_of_Australia